Shiva Rahbaran (born November 28, 1970) is an Iranian writer and researcher.

Life
Shiva Rahbaran was born in Tehran, and was eight years old when the Shah was exiled in 1979. She and her family left Iran for Germany in 1984. She studied literature and political science at the Heinrich Heine University Düsseldorf, before completing a PhD supervised by Christopher Butler at Oxford University, on the writer Nicholas Mosley. The study was later published by Dalkey Archive Press.

After living in Munich and Zurich for twelve years, Rahbaran moved to London in 2013.

Shiva Rahbaran is a contributor to BBC Persian, BBC World and Iran International.

Her short story 'Massoumeh' won the 2016 Wasafiri New Writing Prize.

Works
 Five Past Midnight in Bhopal, 2002 
 The paradox of freedom: a study of Nicholas Mosley's intellectual development in his novels and other writings. Rochester : Dalkey Archive Press, 2006. 
 Nicholas Mosley's Life and Art: A Biography in Six Interviews (Dalkey Archive Scholarly), 2009 
 Iranian writers uncensored: freedom, democracy, and the Word in contemporary Iran. Champaign: Dalkey Archive Press, 2012. 
 Iranian cinema uncensored: contemporary film-makers since the Islamic revolution. London: I.B. Tauris, 2015. 
 'Massoumeh: An Iranian Family in Times of Revolution'. Wasafiri, Vol. 32, Issue 1 (2017), pp. 74–76.

References

External links
 Author's website
 List of author's books, Thriftbooks
 Jadaliyya
 Shiva Rahbaran -marcel hartges
 Guernica

1970 births
Living people
Iranian writers
Heinrich Heine University Düsseldorf alumni
Alumni of the University of Oxford
People from Tehran
Iranian emigrants to Germany
Iranian emigrants to England